TST, formerly known as Top Secret, is a South Korean boy band formed by JSL Company (now known as KJ Music) in 2017. They debuted on January 4, 2017, with Time's Up.

History

2017–2018: Debut, name change and Kyeongha's departure
On January 4, 2017, Top Secret debuted as a seven member group under KJ Music Entertainment with the mini album titled "Time's Up". The group then later came back with the mini album titled "Wake Up" on June 4, 2017.

On April 3, 2018, the group changed their name from "Top Secret" to "TST". On May 23, 2018, TST released their first single and album titled "Love Story". This was Kyeongha's last release with the group. 

On May 24, 2018, it was reported that Kyeongha was found guilty of sexual assault. The victim stated that Kyeongha told her that she aroused his sexual desire while walking on the sidewalk, and when she ran away from him, he followed her into a building and sexually assaulted her in December, 2014. His management agency denied the accusation, when the victim's online post began to circulate after his debut with the group. The victim then filed a lawsuit in April, 2017. Kyeongha and his agency, JSL Company, denied the allegations and filed an appeal on May 29. On May 31, 2018 he received a prison sentence of 18 months in prison, with a probation period of three years, along with 40 hours of treatment program for sexual offenders. After news broke out, M Countdown decided to cancel Top Secret's appearance on the show. On June 11, 2018, it was announced that Kyeongha left the group.

On November 1, 2018, the group returned as a six member group with the single "Paradise".

2019–present: Wooyoung's hiatus, Wake Up, K’s Military Enlistment and Yohan's death
On February 11, 2019, TST released their third single and album titled "Wake Up" which shares the same name as their second mini album. Wooyoung was absent due to health issues.

On February 20, 2019, KJ Music reported through TST's Fan Cafe that Member K will be enlisting in the military to complete his mandatory service on March 21, 2019. 

On January 2, 2020, TST released their fourth single and album title "Countdown". K was not present due to his enlistment in the military and Wooyoung was absent due to health issues.

On June 16, 2020, Yohan (birth name Kim Jeong-hwan) died at the age of 28. The cause of death was not immediately revealed.

Members
 Ain (아인)
 K (케이)
 Wooyoung (우영)
 Junghoon (정훈)
 Yonghyun (용현)

Former members
 Kyeongha (경하)
 Yohan (요한)

Discography

Extended plays

Singles

References

External links
  

K-pop music groups
Musical groups established in 2017
South Korean boy bands
South Korean dance music groups
South Korean pop music groups
Musical groups from Seoul
2017 establishments in South Korea